Flesh for Fantasy is the third studio album by the German stoner rock band Red Aim, released on 6 May 2002 by Metal Blade Records.

Track listing

Personnel 
 Dr. Don Rogers – vocals
 B.B. Foxworth – guitar, hammond organ
 El Davide – bass guitar
 Mitch Buchanan – drums, percussion

References 

Red Aim albums
2002 albums